Yves Gaudin is a Swiss musician, music therapist and writer. He hails from the canton of Valais. He is also known as a researcher in psychology who has worked on language enrichment of autistic children. His first novel, En vérité, was  published in France in 2020.

References

Swiss male writers
Year of birth missing (living people)
Living people
Place of birth missing (living people)
Swiss male musicians
People from Valais